Brüggen Glacier, also known as Pío XI Glacier, is in southern Chile and is the largest western outflow from the Southern Patagonian Ice Field. The glacier continued advancing both northward and southward in the fjord to near its present position before stabilizing. The glacier is named after the German geologist Juan Brüggen Messtorff.

See also
 Bernardo O'Higgins National Park
 Lautaro (volcano)
 List of glaciers

References

External links

   See Figure 55 in this USGS study for a map and discussion of the glacier's advances and retreats
  http://www.glaciologia.cl/pioxi.htm
 Photos of Pío XI Glacier on Flickr
 Photo Gallery

Glaciers of Magallanes Region